Air pollution in Turkey is the most lethal of the nation's environmental issues, with almost everyone across the country exposed to more than World Health Organization guidelines. Over 30,000 people die each year from air pollution-related illnesses; over 8% of the country's deaths. Researchers estimate that reducing air pollution to World Health Organization limits would save seven times the number of lives that were lost in traffic accidents in 2017.

Road transport in Turkish cities  and coal in Turkey are major polluters, but the main factor affecting air pollution levels is vehicle density. The number of vehicles traversing Turkey's roads has increased from 4 million in 1990 to 25 million in 2020. Additionally, ambient air quality and national emissions ceilings do not meet EU standards, and unlike other European countries, many air pollution indicators are not available in Turkey. There is no limit on very small airborne particles (PM2.5), which cause lung diseases and,  they have not been completely inventoried and are not officially reported.

Cars and lorries emit diesel exhaust, particulates, nitrogen oxides (NOx)  and other fumes in cities, but the first of several Turkish national electric cars is planned to start production in 2022. Low-quality lignite coal, burnt in cities and the oldest of the country's coal-fired power stations, is also a big part of the problem.

In early 2020 air pollution in major cities fell significantly due to COVID-19 restrictions, but it started to rise again by the middle of the year. Right to Clean Air Platform Turkey and the Chamber of Environmental Engineers are among organisations campaigning for cleaner air.

Sources of air pollution

Traffic

In 2019 Istanbul had a dangerously high level of NO2 (over three times WHO guidelines). Although Istanbul's urban smog had cleared by early 2020 air pollution in the city increased again once COVID-19 restrictions had been eased. Increasing Turkey's proportion of electric cars in use to 10% by 2030 would also reduce greenhouse gas emissions by Turkey. There are high purchase taxes on new cars and in 2019 about 45% of cars were over 10 years old and energy-inefficient. Continued electrification of the rail network and more high-speed line is one countermeasure being taken. In 2020 strict enforcement of diesel truck emissions was suggested by Sabancı University as a way to get old, polluting vehicles off the road: also in that year tractors have a legal exemption to burn 1000 ppm sulfur diesel.

Heating and cooking
, Turkish coal is still burnt for home heating in low-income districts of Ankara and some other cities, which is bad because Turkish coal is very low-quality.

Coal-fired power stations

Emissions from coal-fired power stations cause severe impacts on public health.  A report from the Health and Environment Alliance (HEAL) estimates that in 2019, there were almost 5,000 premature deaths caused by pollution from coal-fired power stations in Turkey, and over 1.4 million work-days lost to illness.  The Director for Strategy and Campaigns said:  The HEAL report estimates that the health costs of illness caused by coal-fired power stations make up between 13 and 27 percent of Turkey's total annual health expenditure (including both public and private sectors).

Greenpeace Mediterranean say that the coal-fired power plants in Afşin-Elbistan are the power plants with the highest health risk in a European country, followed by Soma power station.

Flue gas emission limits

Since January 2020 flue gas emission limits in mg/Nm3 (milligrams per cubic metre) have been:

These limits allow more pollution than the EU Industrial Emissions Directive. In China (which has a similar income per person), the limits for particulate matter (PM), sulfur dioxide (SO2) and NOx emissions are 10, 35, and 50 mg/m3, respectively.

Passive smoking 

More than a quarter of adults smoke in Turkey, and secondhand smoking, also known as passive smoking, is a danger in itself and increases the risk of respiratory infection.

Industry and construction 
Air pollution from cement production is one of the environmental impacts of concrete. Although asbestos was completely banned in 2010, it can still be a risk when older buildings are demolished, in dumps, and in buildings in some rural areas where it occurs naturally.

Types and levels
Levels across the country are above World Health Organization guidelines. There is no limit on PM2.5 and limits for other pollutants (except SO2) are above WHO guidelines:

Although there is some monitoring of air pollution, many air pollution indicators are not available. The air quality index in Turkey does not include particles smaller than 2.5 microns (PM 2.5), but does include nitrogen dioxide, sulfur dioxide, carbon monoxide, tropospheric ozone and particles between 10 and 2.5 microns in diameter (PM10). According to the OECD Turkey plans to meet EU limits by 2024.

Particulates
Like in other countries, particulates, such as from tyre wear of vehicles in cities, are a danger to people's lungs. Regulations in Turkey do not contain restrictions on particles less than 2.5 microns in diameter (PM 2.5), which cause lung diseases.  average PM2.5 concentration was 42μg/m3, whereas 10 μg/m3 is the World Health Organization (WHO) guideline, and is at dangerous levels in Batman, Hakkari, Siirt, Iğdır, Afyon, Gaziantep, Karaman, and Isparta.

Nitrogen oxides 
Asthma is expensive to treat and can be caused by nitrogen oxides. NO2 in cities such as Ankara is visible from satellites. Existing diesel vehicles emit diesel exhaust NOx and other air pollutants in cities but the first model of Turkish national electric car is planned to start production in 2022.

Sulfur dioxide 
Emissions are mostly from coal-fired power stations, and rose 14% in 2019 to over a megatonne of the world total of 29 megatonnes: Kemerköy power station and the Afşin-Elbistan power stations polluted the surrounding areas with 300 kilotonnes each in 2019.

Volatile organic compounds
 levels of volatile organic compounds (VOCs) in Istanbul were on average similar to those in London and Paris but more variable, with maxima usually exceeding 10 ppb.

Persistent organic pollutants
The emission levels of persistent organic pollutants are regulated, but totals for these emissions were not reported in 2019.

Greenhouse gases

 Turkey emits one percent of the world's greenhouse gas emissions. Because most of the air pollution is caused by burning fossil fuels, greenhouse gas emissions by Turkey would also be reduced by, for example, low emission zones for city traffic, and replacing the distribution of free coal with a different support for poor families. In other words, helping to limit climate change would be a co-benefit of the main health benefits, and health improvement would be a co-benefit of climate change mitigation.

Monitoring and reporting
In 2018 air quality data was available on the website of the Ministry of Environment and Urbanization for 16% of districts and the ministry plans for it to be available for all districts by 2023, increasing the number of monitoring stations to 380. The Chamber of Environmental Engineers publishes a report every year based on this data. The ministry also continuously monitors smokestack emissions from 305 power plants and industrial sites to ensure they do not surpass the limits, but this data is not published as Turkey has not ratified the Gothenburg Protocol on air pollution. There are hourly, daily and yearly average limits for various pollutants in the area around a coal-fired power station, defined as a radius 50 times the chimney height:

Some industrial companies reach Global Reporting Initiative (GRI) 305 emissions standard.

Medical dangers
About 8% of all deaths have been estimated to be due to air pollution. However estimates of annual excess mortality vary between 37,000 and 60,000. Air pollution is a health risk mainly due to burning fossil fuels, such as coal and diesel. Researchers estimate that reducing air pollution to World Health Organization limits would save seven times the number of lives that were lost in traffic accidents in 2017. Although in many places the health effects of air pollution cannot be estimated, because there is not enough monitoring of PM10 and PM2.5 particulates, average excess loss of life (compared to how many would be lost if WHO air pollution guidelines were followed) is estimated to be 0.4 years per person but this will vary by location because, air pollution is severe in some cities. In general it increases the risk from respiratory infections, such as COVID-19, especially in highly polluted cities such as Zonguldak, but this is disputed for some places and more research is needed.

Cities

Many cities in Turkey are more polluted than typical European cities.

Istanbul 
Pollution has lessened since the 1990s. But , measured with the air quality index, Istanbul's air affects the hearts and respiratory systems even of healthy individuals during busy traffic. NO2 is visible in measurements by Orbiting Carbon Observatory 3.

Bursa 
, industry located within the city of Bursa is a particular problem, and it is said to have the worst air pollution in the country. Breathing the air there is equivalent to smoking 38 packs of cigarettes a year. NO2 is visible in satellite measurements.

Ereğli 
A higher rate of multiple sclerosis may be related to local industry in Ereğli.

Relationship to climate change 
Some of the sulphur compounds emitted from Turkey's coal-fired power station chimneys become stratospheric sulfur aerosols, which are the type of short-lived climate forcers which reflect sunlight back into space. However this cooling effect is temporary, as short-lived climate forcers are almost all gone from the atmosphere after 30 years. Between 2004 and 2020, the limit on concentrations of sulphur compounds in flue gas was greatly reduced.

Politics 
The Climate Change and Air Management Coordination Board is responsible for coordination between government departments. , however, according to the EU, better coordinated policies need to be established and implemented.

Economics
The impact of air pollution on the economy via damage to health may be billions of dollars, and an attempt to estimate this more precisely began in 2019. A study of 2015-16 hospital admissions in Erzincan estimated direct costs of air pollution as 2.5% of the total health-related expenditures for the  15–34 and over 65 age groups, but stated that the total cost is likely much higher: for example, the economic costs of the reductions in the intelligence of adults and children have not been estimated. According to medical group Health and Environment Alliance (HEAL), reducing PM 2.5 air pollution in the country would substantially increase GDP. According to the OECD, in 2019 bitumen's exemption from special consumption tax was a subsidy of 5.9 billion lira. Bitumen, also known as asphalt, is used for road surfaces and in hot weather releases secondary organic aerosols, which can damage people's health in cities.

International
, ambient air quality and national emissions ceilings are not up to EU standards.  Turkey has not ratified the Gothenburg Protocol, although it has ratified the original Convention on Long-Range Transboundary Air Pollution and those reports are public. Pollution affects neighbouring countries. The Armenian Nuclear Power Plant, 16 km over the border, is old and said to be insufficiently earthquake proof and vulnerable to military attack.

Proposed solutions
In the Constitution of Turkey, Article 56 reads, "Everyone has the right to live in a healthy and balanced environment. It is the duty of the State and citizens to improve the natural environment, to protect the environmental health and to prevent environmental pollution."

According to the Eleventh Development Plan (2019-2023), all districts will be monitored by 2023 and:

Air quality management practices will be enabled to prevent air pollution from production, heating and traffic, and air quality will be improved by controlling emissions.

Air quality action plans will be prepared at local level and legislation on pollution and emission control will be updated.

Air quality management capacity will be improved by strengthening regional clean air centres.

Research on air quality modelling and monitoring will be conducted and infrastructure will be developed.

Quitting coal is said to be essential, and the market share of diesel cars is falling. Strengthening environmental laws is said to benefit the economy of Turkey. The Ministry of the Environment has drafted a law limiting PM 2.5 but it has not yet been passed. According to the HEAL, over 500 premature deaths could be avoided per year by shutting down three power stations in Muğla.

Electric ferryboats have been proposed for the Bosphoros. A low-emission zone for road traffic has been suggested for Istanbul and it has been suggested that Turkey's vehicle tax system should be changed to better charge for pollution. More green space is suggested for cities. Seven regional clean air centers have been created and the deputy environment minister said in 2020 that low-emissions areas will be created and bike lanes increased.

History
Lead was first smelted around 5000 BC in Anatolia and in 535 AD Justinian I acknowledged the importance of clean air. In the 19th century air pollution was thought of in terms of miasma, the idea that foul smells could cause disease. Due to the high cost of oil after the 1970s oil crisis, cities burnt more lignite for residential heating. An Air Pollution Control Regulation was issued in the 1980s and air quality monitoring began in that decade. In early 2020 most air pollution in major cities fell significantly due to the COVID-19 restrictions, but tropospheric ozone (a leading cause of smog) increased as there were fewer particles to block the sunlight. Air pollution started to rise again by the middle of the year.

References

Sources

External links 
 Official Air Quality Map
 Methane map
 Turkey fact sheets European Environment Agency
 Right to Clean Air Platform Right to Clean Air Platform Turkey
 Chamber of Environmental Engineers
 2019 World Clean Air Congress in Istanbul

Turkey
Pollution in Turkey
Environment of Turkey